The 10th Annual Helpmann Awards for live performance in Australia were held on 6 September 2010 at the Sydney Opera House.

Winners and nominees
In the following tables, winners are listed first and highlighted in boldface. The nominees are those which are listed below the winner and not in boldface.

Theatre

Musicals

Opera and classical music

Dance and physical theatre

Contemporary music

Other

Industry

Special awards

References

External links

Helpmann Awards
Helpmann Awards
Helpmann Awards
Helpmann Awards
Helpmann Awards, 10th
Helpmann Awards